Provo Towne Centre is an enclosed shopping mall in Provo, Utah. Opened in 1998, the mall is anchored by JCPenney, a classic cars display, and a Cinemark movie theater. It is managed by Jones Lang LaSalle.

History
When the mall was being built, developers JP Realty filed a lawsuit against the city of Orem for offering incentives to keep ZCMI from relocating its store from University Mall. Also, the Provo city council wanted JP Realty to call the mall "Utah Valley Towne Centre" instead.

The mall ultimately opened in 1998, causing JCPenney to relocate from University Mall. General Growth Properties acquired the mall in 2002 when it purchased JP Realty's portfolio.  In 2008 the MTV film American Mall was filmed at the mall. Brixton Capital purchased the mall in February 2016, and Jones Lange LaSalle manages the mall.

On May 5, 2017, it was announced that Sears would be closing as part of a plan to close 30 stores nationwide. The store closed in July 2017. It has plans for redevelopment in the future.

A BRT station opened on the east side of the mall near JCPenney in August 2018 as part of the UVX system between Orem and Provo operated by the UTA. The station is called Towne Centre Boulevard.

On January 15, 2020, Dillard's announced that a location would be built at the site of the former Macy's at University Place in Orem in early 2021 that would replace the current Provo location. This will leave JCPenney as the only traditional anchor left. On February 7, 2023, it was announced that Target would be replacing the former Dillard's

Anchors
JCPenney
Cinemark
Target (under construction)

References

External links
Official website

Shopping malls in Utah
Shopping malls established in 1998
Brookfield Properties
Buildings and structures in Provo, Utah
1998 establishments in Utah